St. Gregorios High School is a coeducational secondary school located in Chembur, Mumbai. It is affiliated to the Indian Certificate of Secondary Education (ICSE) and Indian School Certificate (ISC) and was established in 1992. The principal of the school is Ms. Sara D'Souza

Overview

Recognition 
In 2015, one of its students, Sanjana Ravjiani, stood third in the nation in the final examination of the Indian School Certificate Examinations with an aggregate score of 99.25%.

Rankings

School Features 
The school follows the ICSE course syllabus, as set out by the CISCE board in Delhi.

It runs classes from kindergarten (officially 'Nursery') to the 12th grade. The classes are divided into 4 parts – Pre-Primary or Pre-School (consisting of Nursery, Junior Kindergarten and Senior Kindergarten), Primary or Elementary (from the 1st to the 5th Grade), Secondary or Middle School (the 6th, 7th and 8th Grades) and High School (from the 9th to the 12th Grade). The average class size is of 40-50 students.

The students are divided among four houses named Aqua, Fauna, Flora and Terra which compete through the year in extracurricular activities. The school has a distinct Student Council and looks after the discipline and organises all events. It is led by the Head Boy and Head Girl, who work together with House Captains, Vice Captains, Sports and Discipline Captains and the Discipline Squad. The middle section maintains its own Student Council. Each house is looked after by a teacher-in-charge. The School is an active participant in sports  and co-curriculars

References 

Primary schools in India
Christian schools in Maharashtra
Private schools in Mumbai
High schools and secondary schools in Mumbai
Schools in Chembur
Educational institutions established in 1992
1992 establishments in Maharashtra